"If You Need Me" is a song by American singer-song writer Julia Michaels and recorded for the Facebook Watch series, Sorry for Your Loss, a series based on a group of women who have also experienced loss in their lives. The song was released on September 13, 2019.

Music video
The video features footage of Michaels personally meeting members of the Sorry for Your Loss community on Facebook. In a statement released along with the video, Michaels said "When I first met Carol [one of the group members], she said those women were a tribe. There are many people out there who are willing to love you, and willing to listen – you just have to find the right people who will do that. When I read all the comments around Sorry for Your Loss, about everybody being there for each other, I sort of wanted to write [the song] from that angle. I think that's one of the best parts about songwriting, that I can channel someone's feelings and put them into a song."

Reception
Mike Wass from Idolator called it "the kind of emotional, anthemic track that gets under your skin from the very first listen."

Charts

Release history

References

2019 songs
2019 singles
Julia Michaels songs
Songs written by Julia Michaels
Songs written by JP Saxe
Songs written by Ben Rice (producer)
Song recordings produced by Ben Rice (producer)